White Cargo is a 1942 film.

White Cargo may also refer to:

 White Cargo (1930 film), a British drama film
 White Cargo (1937 film), a French drama film
 White Cargo (1973 film), a British comedy film
 White Cargo (cocktail), a boozy milkshake made with gin